Haut Atlas Oriental National Park (French: Parc National du Haut Atlas Oriental) is located in Morocco. Parts of the park have been designated as a protected Ramsar site since 2005.

The park was established to preserve cultural values along with its populations of Barbary sheep, Cuvier's Gazelle, birds, amphibians, reptiles, and vegetation.

A proposed National Park, this site covers 55,252 ha of the High Atlas between Midelt and Er Rachidia. The base rock consists of limestone with some igneous intrusions. The site ranges in altitude from 1,645 m in the bed of the Oued Arheddou to 3,102 m at the summit of Jbel Tanrhourt. At its western end it includes the twin lakes of Isli and Tislit, near Imilchil. The northern slopes enjoy an annual precipitation of 400–600 mm, and are consequently well-wooded, while the southern slopes are drier, receiving only 200–300 mm, and are more open. Winter snows are abundant and long-lasting at the higher elevations. On the northern side, woody vegetation consists of dense cedar (Cedrus atlantica) and pine (Pinus pinaster maghrebiana) forests, oak (Quercus rotundifolia) woodland, open Juniperus thurifera woodland and, at lower altitudes, some Pinus halepensis. The mountain summits and high plateaus support xerophytic steppe vegetation, and there is some grassland in wetter areas. On the southern slopes cedar woodland is disappearing, but sparse oak and pine woodland persists. Steppe vegetation is predominant, dominated by Stipa tenacissima at lower altitudes.

Footnotes

References
 Parc National du Haut Atlas Oriental. Birdlife International. Accessed 2011-11-15.

National parks of Morocco
Ramsar sites in Morocco
Geography of Béni Mellal-Khénifra
Geography of Drâa-Tafilalet